Fly is the second album by Yoko Ono, released in 1971. A double album, it was co-produced by Ono and John Lennon. It peaked at No. 199 on the US charts.

The album includes the singles  "Mrs. Lennon" and "Mind Train." The track "Airmale" is the soundtrack to Lennon's time-lapse film Erection, while "Fly" is the soundtrack to Lennon and Ono's 1970 film Fly.

Recording
The album was recorded around the same time as Lennon's Imagine. "Hirake" was a partially re-recorded version of the B-side "Open Your Box", completed in response to a managing director of EMI calling the lyrics "distasteful". The verse "Open your trousers, open your skirt, open your legs and open your thighs", was changed to "open your houses", "…church", "…lakes", and "…eyes". Lennon and Ono didn't complain about the change of words, and only "wanted to get the record out", as a spokesman said.

The track "Don't Worry, Kyoko (Mummy's Only Looking for Her Hand in the Snow)" is dedicated to Ono's daughter Kyoko Cox. 

Side three of the LP features Ono performing with various automated sound machines created by Fluxus musician Joe Jones and pictured in the gatefold.

"Will You Touch Me" was first recorded during the Fly sessions. It was later re-recorded for Yoko's shelved 1974 album A Story and for 1981's Season of Glass. The original demo version was included on the Rykodisc reissue of Fly in 1997.

Release
The original release was a complete avant-garde/Fluxus package in a gatefold sleeve that came with a full-size poster and a postcard to order Ono's 1964 book Grapefruit.

Each edition of the US, UK and Japanese albums utilized that country's distinctive telephone ring in the track "Telephone Piece" (i.e. each edition of the album used entirely different recordings) – the Rykodisc CD edition used the US variation.

Fly peaked at number 199 in the Billboard charts. On 1 February 1972, Lennon and Ono Lennon performed "Midsummer New York" backed by Elephant's Memory for an episode of The Mike Douglas Show, which aired on 15 February.

Reception

The album was a significant influence to British power electronics musician William Bennett of Whitehouse fame. Ned Raggett of AllMusic stated that "Perhaps the best measure of Fly is how Ono ended up inventing Krautrock, or perhaps more seriously bringing the sense of motorik's pulse and slow-building tension to an English-language audience. There weren't many artists of her profile in America getting trancey, heavy-duty songs like "Mindtrain" and the murky ambient howls of "Airmale" out."

Track listing
All songs written by Yoko Ono.

Side one
"Midsummer New York" – 3:50
"Mind Train" – 16:52

Side two
"Mind Holes" – 2:45
"Don't Worry, Kyoko (Mummy's Only Looking for Her Hand in the Snow)" – 4:55
"Mrs. Lennon" – 4:10
"Hirake" (previously released as "Open Your Box") – 3:32
"Toilet Piece/Unknown" – 0:30
"O'Wind (Body Is the Scar of Your Mind)" – 5:22

Side three
"Airmale" – 10:40
"Don't Count the Waves" – 5:26  
"You" – 9:00  

Side four
"Fly" – 22:53
"Telephone Piece" – 0:33

For unknown reasons, John Lennon was credited as co-writer of "Mind Train", "Mind Holes", "Toilet Piece/Unknown" and "Telephone Piece" on the disc faces of the 1997 Rykodisc reissue. Lennon has not been credited as co-writer of these tracks on any other release of Fly.

Personnel
Yoko Ono – vocals, claves on "Airmale" and "Don't Count the Waves"
John Lennon – guitar, piano on "Mrs. Lennon", organ, automated music machines on "Airmale" and "Don't Count the Waves"
Klaus Voormann – guitar, bass guitar, bells on "Mrs. Lennon", cymbal on "O'Wind", percussion on "Don't Count the Waves"
Bobby Keys – claves on "O'Wind"
Eric Clapton – guitar on "Don't Worry, Kyoko (Mummy's Only Looking for Her Hand in the Snow)"
Jim Keltner – drums, tabla, percussion
Ringo Starr – drums on "Don't Worry, Kyoko (Mummy's Only Looking for Her Hand in the Snow)"
Jim Gordon – drums on "Hirake", tabla on "O'Wind"
Chris Osborne – dobro on "Midsummer New York" and "Mind Train"
Joe Jones – automated music machines on "Airmale", "Don't Count the Waves" and "You"
George Marino – mastering engineer

Charts

Release history

References

1971 albums
Yoko Ono albums
Avant-pop albums
Fluxus
Apple Records albums
Rykodisc albums
Albums produced by John Lennon
Albums produced by Yoko Ono
Albums recorded in a home studio